Yarsky District (Jar joros) is an administrative and municipal district (raion), one of the twenty-five in the Udmurt Republic, Russia. It is located in the northwest of the republic. Its administrative center is the rural locality (a settlement) of Yar. Population:  18,880 (2002 Census);  The population of Yar accounts for 43.2% of the district's total population.

References

Notes

Sources

Districts of Udmurtia